The Drascombe Lugger is a British trailerable sailboat that was designed by John L. Watkinson and first built in 1968.

The Drascombe Lugger design is the basis of a large range of similar Drascombe boats with different hull, cabin and rig configurations.

Production
The design is built by Honnor Marine Classics and also by Churchouse Boats, now called Drascombe Boats in the United Kingdom. Production started in 1968, with more than 2,000 boats completed and the design remains in production.

Design

The boat was designed by Watkinson, who was a former Royal Navy officer. In the early 1960s he wanted to build a small boat for his own family use. His design goals were for a day sailer with trailerability, that would be stable and safe, but still exciting to sail for experienced sailors.

The prototype was built of wood on a farm in Drascombe Barton. The design was based upon the fishing boats used on  England's northeastern coast, which trace their lineage back to the Viking longships. The first boats had a lug rig, for which it was named, later switching to a Gunter rig.

The design was put into production, made from fiberglass and proved a commercial success. Boats have been built commercially on a production line and also by amateur builders. Plans for home construction have not been available since the death of the designer in 1997.

The Drascombe Lugger is a recreational open sailboat, built predominantly of fiberglass, with wooden spars and trim. It features a spooned raked stem, a raised transom, an internally mounted fold-up rudder controlled by a tiller and a centreboard. It can be equipped with a bowsprit and cutter rig. It displaces  and carries  of ballast in the steel centreboard.

For docking and maneuvering, the boat is normally fitted with a small outboard motor, located in an aft well.

Operational history
David Pyle and David Derrick completed a voyage from England to Australia during 1969 and 1970 in the Drascombe Lugger Hermes.  The boat was a standard production model with a raised foredeck and other minor modifications built at Kelly and Hall's boatyard in Newton Ferrers, by John and Douglas Elliott.

From 1978 and 1984, Webb Chiles almost completed an open boat circumnavigation of the world in his two Luggers Chidiock Tichborne I and Chidiock Tichborne II. He started the trip in California with Chidiock I and crossed the Pacific Ocean, the Indian Ocean and entered the Red Sea. In the Pacific near Vanuatu, the boat capsized in heavy weather and then drifted for two weeks, as he was unable to bail it out. After becoming damaged in the Red Sea the boat was seized by the Saudi Arabian government and Chiles was arrested on suspicion of being a spy. After being released Chiles had a new Lugger, Chiddiock II, shipped to him in Egypt and he restarted the voyage. He sailed back south to intercept his previous track and then turned towards the  Suez Canal and passed into the Mediterranean Sea and into the Atlantic to La Palma in the Canary Islands. Leaving the boat there to visit Tenerife, he returned to find that the boat had capsized on her mooring during a storm. With the loss of much of his gear, Chiles decided to end his open boat circumnavigation attempt.

A review in Small Boats Magazine by Audrey and Kent Lewis stated, "We think the Drascombe Lugger is one [of] the most versatile small boats ever built."

A 2008 review by John Kretschmer in Sailing Magazine, noted the boat's stability and ability to deal with high winds by reducing sail. He wrote, "Luggers have pleasant lines, with a nice sheer and comfortable seating. A bronze stemhead, wood gunwales, Sitka spruce mast and a set of belaying pins at the base of the mast give the boat a bit of a salty air." He concluded, "Should I say you really shouldn't take off to Tahiti on your Lugger? Well, you shouldn't. They are unballasted, open boats. But they come with such good manners and are endowed with so much enjoyment you may find yourself heading that way. Don't say I didn't warn you."

See also
List of sailing boat types

Related design
Drascombe Scaffie

Similar sailboats
Buccaneer 200
Catalina 18
Com-Pac Sunday Cat
Hunter 18.5
Hunter 19-1
Hunter 19 (Europa)
Hunter 146
Mercury 18
Naiad 18
Sandpiper 565
Sanibel 17
Siren 17
Typhoon 18

References

External links

Keelboats
1960s sailboat type designs
Sailing yachts
Trailer sailers
Sailboat type designs by John L. Watkinson
Sailboat types built by  Honnor Marine Classics
Sailboat types built by Churchouse Boats
Sailboat types built by Drascombe Boats